On Borrowed Time (also known as Shabab Sheyab, in Arabic) is a 2018 Comedy-drama film directed and written by Yasir Al Yasiri.

Cast
 Saad Al Faraj as Abu Hassan
 Salloum Hadad as The General
 Mansoor Al Feeli as The pharmacist 
 Fouad Ali as Khaled )
 Marie Al Halyan as Abu Hamad

Reception
The film premiered at the Palm Springs International Film Festival in California. The film got the attention of the US media.
The film after that was shown in many other film festivals in the United States winning two awards as best film and getting high reviews as one of the best international films coming from the Arab world.

References

External links
 

2018 comedy-drama films
2010s Arabic-language films
Emirati comedy-drama films